Peter Symonds was a merchant.

Peter Symonds may also refer to:

Peter Symonds College
Peter Symonds Charity

See also
Peter Simons (disambiguation)